The discography of Paolo Nutini, a Scottish pop/rock singer, contains four studio albums, one live album, six extended plays, eight singles and ten music videos. Nutini's debut album, These Streets, was released by Atlantic Records in the United Kingdom in July 2006. The album peaked at number three on the UK Albums Chart and has been certified five-times platinum by the British Phonographic Industry. The album also peaked within the top twenty on the Australian Album Chart, French Album Chart, Irish Albums Chart and in the Dutch Album Chart. Singles released from the album were: "Last Request", "Jenny Don't Be Hasty", "Rewind" and "New Shoes". "Last Request" was the most successful, reaching number five on the UK Singles Chart and number eight on the Irish Singles Chart. In May 2009, Nutini released his second album, Sunny Side Up, which debuted at number one in the UK and in Ireland. It contained the singles: "Candy", "Coming Up Easy", "Pencil Full of Lead" and "10/10". Sunny Side Up has also been certified five-times platinum by the BPI and was the eighth biggest-selling album in the UK in 2009.

Nutini's most recent album Last Night in the Bittersweet was released in 2022, eight years after Caustic Love, which was released in April 2014.  A single from that album, "Scream (Funk My Life Up)", was released in January 2014.

Nutini is also known for his live performances and numerous extended plays of some of his recordings. His first, the Live Sessions EP, was released in September 2006 and featured exclusive live versions of four fan favourite tracks mainly recorded in London. Recorded Live at Preservation Hall was released exclusively in the United States in March 2010 and features renditions of songs originally found on Sunny Side Up; it was then re-released as a limited edition album in independent record stores in April.

Albums

Studio albums

Live albums

Extended plays

Singles

Other charted songs

Music videos

Other appearances

Writing credits

Notes

References
General

Specific

External links
 Paolo Nutini Official website
 
 Paolo Nutini at Musicbrainz

Discographies of British artists
Pop music discographies